Don't Throw Stones is the second studio album by Australian rock and pop band The Sports, released in February 1979; a limited edition with a bonus 7" promotional single of "Reckless". The album peaked at number 9 on the Australian Kent Music Report and was certified gold.

In 2010, the album was listed at number 51 on the 100 Best Australian Albums.

Reception

Luis Feliu from The Canberra Times felt "plenty of admiration for their punchy and melodic rockabilly sound, [he] found the change to the more diverse, bigger-breath songs of new a wee strange but acceptable."

Track listing

Bonus 7" Single

Personnel
The Sports
 Steve Cummings - vocals
 Martin Armiger - guitar, backing vocals
 Andrew Pendlebury - guitar, backing vocals
 Jim Niven - keyboards, backing vocals 
 Robert Glover - bass
 Paul Hitchins - drums
with:
 Wilbur Wilde - saxophone
 Peter Solley - additional keyboards
 M. Burns - synthesiser
 G. Hyde - percussion

Charts

References

The Sports albums
Mushroom Records albums
1979 albums